Cummings House may refer to:

Cummings House (Palatka, Florida), listed on the NRHP in Florida
Cummings' Guest House, Old Orchard Beach, Maine, listed on the NRHP in Maine
Holt-Cummings-Davis House, Andover, Massachusetts, listed on the NRHP in Massachusetts
E.E. Cummings House, Cambridge, Massachusetts, listed on the NRHP in Massachusetts
E. B. Cummings House, Southbridge, Massachusetts, listed on the NRHP in Massachusetts
Wilson S. Cummings House, Fredericktown, Ohio, listed on the NRHP in Ohio
Judge Will Cummings House, Chattanooga, Tennessee, listed on the NRHP in Tennessee 
Cummings House (Houston, Texas), listed on the NRHP in Texas
Byron Cummings House, Salt Lake City, Utah, listed on the NRHP in Utah

See also
Cummins House (disambiguation)